Lucienne Boyer (18 August 1901 – 6 December 1983) was a French diseuse and singer, best known for her song "Parlez-moi d'amour". Her impresario was Bruno Coquatrix. According to the New York Times, she "reigned as queen of Paris nightlife during the 1930's".

Early career
She was born Émilienne-Henriette Boyer in Montparnasse, Paris, France. Her melodious voice gave her the chance, while working as a part-time model, to begin singing in cabarets at age 16. An office position at a prominent Parisian theater opened the door for her and within a few years, under the name Lucienne Boyer, she was singing in major Parisian music halls.

Popular success

In 1927, Boyer sang at a concert by the great star Félix Mayol where she was seen by the American impresario Lee Shubert who immediately offered her a contract to come to Broadway. Boyer spent nine months in New York City, returning to perform there and to South America numerous times throughout the 1930s. 

By 1933, she had made a large number of recordings for Columbia Records of France including her signature song, "Parlez-moi d'amour" (Speak to Me of Love). Written by Jean Lenoir, the song won the first-ever Grand Prix du Disque of the Charles Cros Academy.

Personal life
Boyer lost her soldier father in World War I and had to go to work in a munitions factory to help her family get by.

In 1939, she married the cabaret singer Jacques Pills of the very popular duo Pills et Tabet. Their daughter Jacqueline, born on 23 April 1941, followed in their footsteps, becoming a very successful singer who won the 1960 Eurovision Song Contest.

Throughout World War II, Boyer continued to perform in France, but for her Jewish husband,  it was a very difficult time. Following the Allied Forces liberation of France, her cabaret career flourished and for another thirty years, she maintained a loyal following. At the age of 73, she sang with her daughter at the famous Paris Olympia and appeared on several French television shows.

Death
She died in Paris, and was interred in the Cimetière de Bagneux in Montrouge, near Paris.

References

Adapted from the article Lucienne Boyer, from Wikinfo, licensed under the GNU Free Documentation License.

External links
 

1901 births
1983 deaths
Musicians from Paris
Burials at the Cimetière parisien de Bagneux
Boyer, Lucienne
20th-century French women singers
Columbia Records artists